Serine/threonine-protein phosphatase 4 regulatory subunit 3B is an enzyme that in humans is encoded by the SMEK2 gene.

Interactions 

SMEK2 has been shown to interact with PPP4C.

References

Further reading